Claus Christian Claussen (born March 26, 1961) is a German lawyer, notary and politician of the Christian Democratic Union (CDU).

Personal Life and Education 
Claus Christian Claussen was born in Bad Segeberg in Schleswig-Holstein. He lives in Bargteheide, is married and has five children.

Claussen studied law at the University of Hamburg from 1982 to 1992 and worked as a lawyer at a law firm in Flensburg from 1992 to 1995.

Career 
From 1995 to 1997, he worked at the Waterways and Shipping Directorate in Kiel. Since 1997, he is an unaffiliated lawyer and in 2001, he became a licensed notary.

Claussen became a member of the Young Union in 1975 and a member of the Christian Democratic Union (CDU) in 1993, upon which he became deputy district chairman in Flensburg. In 1998, he got elected as a member of the municipal council of Bargteheide. In 2000, he became a board member of the Schleswig-Holstein Christian Democratic Union (CDU), a position he held until 2016. Claussen was Deputy Mayor of Bargteheide from 2008 to 2018. He was elected a member of the Schleswig-Holstein Landtag in the 2017 Schleswig-Holstein state elections and assumed his office on June 6, 2017.

He was appointed Schleswig-Holstein Minister of Justice, European Affairs and Consumer Protection by Minister-President Daniel Günther on May 4, 2020, succeeding Sabine Sütterlin-Waack. He was succeeded by Kerstin von der Decken 29 June 2022.

Claussen was elected a Member of the Landtag of Schleswig-Holstein in the 2022 Schleswig-Holstein state election.

References 

Living people
1961 births
21st-century German politicians
Ministers of the Schleswig-Holstein State Government
Christian Democratic Union of Germany